The Rev. James M. Demske Sports Complex is a baseball, soccer, lacrosse, and softball venue in Buffalo, New York, United States.  It is home to the Canisius Golden Griffins baseball, men's and women's soccer, men's and women's lacrosse, and softball teams of the NCAA Division I Metro Atlantic Athletic Conference (MAAC). Built in 1989, the venue has a capacity of 1,200 spectators.  The building is named for Rev. James Demske, who served as the President of Canisius College from 1966 until 1993.  It is located behind the Koessler Athletic Center on Canisius' campus.  To save space and money in the college's urban setting, the  facility is home to six Canisius athletic programs.

From 1989 to 2008, the facility had an AstroTurf 12 surface.  In 2008, renovations installed  of A-Turf, which lessens the impact on athletes who play on the surface.  Also in 2008, new scoreboard and baseball dugouts were added.  The facility also features stadium lighting and locker rooms.

In 2004, 2009, and 2011, the venue hosted the MAAC Men's Lacrosse Championships.  In 2010, it hosted the MAAC Softball Championships.  In May 2012, it hosted the MAAC Women's Lacrosse Championships.

See also 
 List of NCAA Division I baseball venues

References

External links 
New Turf Photo Gallery August 2008 at GoGriffs.com

1989 establishments in New York (state)
American football venues in New York (state)
Baseball venues in New York (state)
Canisius Golden Griffins baseball
Canisius Golden Griffins football
College baseball venues in the United States
College lacrosse venues in the United States
College soccer venues in the United States
College softball venues in the United States
Defunct college football venues
Lacrosse venues in New York (state)
Soccer venues in New York (state)
Softball venues in New York (state)
Sports venues completed in 1989
Sports venues in Buffalo, New York
Sports venues in Erie County, New York